"A Disturbing Case" is the second episode of the 1969 British television series Randall and Hopkirk (Deceased), distributed by ITC Entertainment and starring Mike Pratt, Kenneth Cope and Annette Andre. The episode was first broadcast on 28 September 1969 on ITV. It was directed by Ray Austin.

Synopsis
Jeff Randall initially collapses unconscious after being lightly thrown against a door by Phillip and Pentonville, the two hospital heavies, but later under hypnosis he beats some five men in fights, including Dr. Conrad. Marty is seen pulling objects such as a door towards Jeff's head by inhaling in this episode. When teleporting to a specific location he is also heard to say "Made it! My sense of direction is improving!"

In this episode Jeannie's presumably younger sister Jenny is introduced. Like actress Annette Andre who portrays Jeannie she is also real-life Australian, and the likeness between them is similar. Currently unemployed, she's staying with Jeannie from outside London, what she terms "the sticks".

Cast
Mike Pratt as Jeff Randall
Kenneth Cope as Marty Hopkirk
Annette Andre as Jeannie Hopkirk
Judith Arthy ....  Jennifer
Patrick Jordan ....  Smart
Les White ....  Hales, the Chauffeur
Charles Morgan ....  Arthur Phillips
Michael Griffiths ....  Inspector Nelson
Adrian Ropes ....  Sergeant
David Bauer ....  Dr. Conrad
Gerald Flood ....  Dr. Lambert
Geoffrey Reed ....  1st Male Nurse
Max Faulkner ....  2nd Male Nurse
William Mervyn ....  Whitty

Production
The exteriors for The Lambert Clinic Nursing Home were shot at The Grocer's Institute on Grange Lane, Letchmore Heath. Whitty's home exterior was filmed at a private house named Aragon on Aldenham Road, Letchmore Heath. Arthur Phillips house was shot on the exterior standing backlot sets at ABC Elstree studios, Borehamwood.

A finished print was completed by late August 1969. It is listed as episode 22 in ITC publicity.

Video and DVD release
The episode was released on VHS and several times on DVD with differing special features. "A Disturbing Case" was released by Carlton on DVD with the first episode "My Late Lamented Friend and Partner". Silent behind-the-scenes footage of this episode was included as an extra on the fourth region 2 DVD. Shot by a 2nd unit crew using stand-ins for the leads, the sequence ran to 1'06m.

External links
http://www.anorakzone.com/randall/

Randall and Hopkirk (Deceased) episodes
1969 British television episodes